The Canadian Screen Awards are awards given for artistic and technical merit in the film industry recognizing excellence in Canadian film, English-language television, and digital media (web series) productions. Given annually by the Academy of Canadian Cinema & Television, the awards recognize excellence in cinematic achievements, as assessed by the Academy's voting membership.

The awards were first presented in 2013 as the result of a merger of the Gemini Awards and Genie Awards—the Academy's previous awards presentations for television (English-language) and film productions. They are widely considered to be the most prestigious award for Canadian entertainers, artists, and filmmakers, often referred to as the equivalent of the Oscars and Emmy Awards in the United States, the BAFTA Awards in the United Kingdom, the AACTA Awards in Australia, the IFTA Awards in Ireland, the César Awards in France and the Goya Awards in Spain.

History
The award's historic roots stem from the Canadian Film Awards, which were presented for film from 1949 to 1978, and the ACTRA Awards, which were presented for television from 1972 to 1986. The Academy took over the CFAs in 1978 to create the new Genie Awards, and took over the ACTRAs in 1986 to create the Gemini Awards. The Academy additionally created the Bijou Awards in 1981 as a new home for CFA specialty categories, such as television films, that had not been retained by the Genie Awards, but presented them only once before discontinuing that program.

In April 2012, the Academy announced that it would merge the Geminis and the Genies into a new awards show that would better recognize Canadian accomplishments in film, television, and digital media. On 4 September 2012, the Academy announced that the new ceremony would be known as the Canadian Screen Awards, reflecting the multi-platform nature of the presentation's expanded scope and how Canadians consume media content. The inaugural ceremony, hosted by comedian Martin Short and broadcast by CBC Television, took place on 3 March 2013.

Due to the number of awards presented, many of the less prominent awards are presented at a series of untelevised galas during Canadian Screen Week, the week leading up to the televised ceremonies. On the night of the main gala, the ceremony also starts approximately two hours earlier than the telecast, with additional awards being presented whose winners are recognized in short montages during the main ceremony, and only the most important film and television categories are presented during the live broadcast.

On March 12, 2020 it was announced that the 8th Canadian Screen Awards ceremony was cancelled due to the COVID-19 pandemic. The winners were announced in a series of livestreams in the final week of May 2020. The 9th Canadian Screen Awards were also postponed due to the pandemic, with nominees announced on March 23, 2021, and Canadian Screen Week scheduled for May 17 to 20, 2021, again as a series of livestreams.

In August 2022, the Academy announced that it will discontinue its past practice of presenting gendered awards for film and television actors and actresses; beginning with the 11th Canadian Screen Awards in 2023, gender-neutral awards for Best Performance will be presented, with eight nominees per category instead of five.

Name
As of 2020, the Academy has not announced any official nickname, such as "Oscar" for the Academy Awards. Many Canadian television and film critics and others have suggested potential nicknames, including the straightforward abbreviation "Screenies"; tributes to film and television legends including "Candys" in memory of actor John Candy, "Pickfords" in honour of actress Mary Pickford and "Normans" in honour of director Norman Jewison; "Angels" as a descriptive reference to the trophy's "wings"; and "Gemininies" as a portmanteau of the awards' former names.

The Academy invited suggestions from viewers via social media, with CEO Helga Stephenson suggesting that the board would consider the suggestions and potentially announce a naming choice in time for the 2014 ceremony. No formal nickname was announced at the time; numerous media outlets settled on the informal "Screenies".

At the 4th Canadian Screen Awards in 2016, host Norm Macdonald called in his opening monologue for the awards to be named the Candys; several presenters and winners followed his lead throughout the evening, referring to the award as "The Candy" in their presentation announcements or acceptance speeches, and John Candy's former SCTV colleagues Eugene Levy and Catherine O'Hara both endorsed Macdonald's proposal in the press room. Macdonald had not sought input from the Academy itself prior to his monologue, although he ran the idea past the ceremony's broadcast producer Barry Avrich. At the 5th Canadian Screen Awards in 2017, host Howie Mandel offered his own nickname proposal, suggesting that the awards be dubbed the "STDs" to stand for "Screen, Television and Digital", although his suggestion was less positively received. The show is currently commonly known as the CSAs.

Rules 
To be eligible for nominations, a title must be either a Canadian production or co-production; international film or television projects shot in Canada without direct Canadian production involvement are not eligible. Canadians cannot receive nominations for working on foreign productions that were not otherwise eligible for CSA consideration, but foreign nationals may be nominated for work on eligible Canadian films.

A feature film must have received at least one full week of commercial theatrical screenings in at least two of the Calgary, Edmonton, Halifax, Montreal, Ottawa, Quebec City, Saskatoon, St. John's, Toronto, Vancouver, Victoria and/or Winnipeg markets between 1 January of the qualifying year and the date of the awards ceremony in the presentation year. A film may be submitted and even nominated before it has fully met these criteria, so long as it can provide satisfactory proof that the criteria will be fulfilled by the date of the ceremony.

Film festival screenings are not directly relevant to the inclusion criteria for feature films; as long as it meets the commercial screening criteria, a film may in fact have had its initial film festival premiere up to 1.5 years earlier than 1 January of the qualifying year. Although due to the more periodic nature of Canadian film distribution it may be possible for a film to meet the qualifying criteria in more than one separate year, a film may not be resubmitted to the awards committee more than once. The eligibility criteria for feature films have faced criticism from some independent film producers, however, as they effectively exclude films which pursue distribution strategies more strongly based on streaming media platforms such as Netflix or Crave from consideration in film categories — unlike the Academy Awards, where the eligibility rules permit films from streaming services. Despite this conflict, films which premiered theatrically, but did not surpass the theatrical screening criteria and thus were never submitted in film categories before being released on a television or streaming platform, are eligible to receive nominations in the television categories. 

Under certain circumstances, it may also be possible for a film to be nominated in both film and television categories. For example, the 2020 documentary film One of Ours was a nominee for Best Feature Length Documentary at the 10th Canadian Screen Awards in 2022 due to its theatrical run; however, as the Academy does not present awards for best direction or best writing in theatrical documentary films, but does present awards for best direction and writing in television documentaries, its television broadcast later in the year earned Yasmine Mathurin nominations in the television categories at the same ceremony. However, a film cannot be considered in both film and television categories that directly duplicate each other; for instance, a film cannot be considered for both Best Picture and Best TV Movie.

Due to the impact of the COVID-19 pandemic on theatrical film distribution in 2020, special rules for the 9th Canadian Screen Awards permitted films that were commercially screened on an Academy-approved list of video on demand platforms after having been planned for conventional theatrical distribution, as well as films that were screened online as part of any Canadian film festival that proceeded virtually in 2020; as well, the number of commercial theatrical screenings required for eligibility was temporarily reduced to just four screenings in one of the regular markets. Other new changes at the 9th ceremony included the renaming of the Overall Sound category to Sound Mixing, and the introduction of a new category for Best Casting in films.

Feature documentaries are eligible if they have received three commercial theatrical screenings anywhere in Canada within the same time period as narrative features, or if they have screened at two qualifying film festivals within the calendar year. Animated short films are eligible if they have received one commercial theatrical screening anywhere in Canada, or have been screened at two qualifying festivals, within the calendar year; live action short films are eligible if they have received one commercial theatrical screening anywhere in Canada, or have been screened at three qualifying festivals, within the calendar year. Documentary and short films are also automatically deemed eligible for nomination if they have won an award at an Academy Award-qualifying Canadian or international film festival within the qualifying period, even if they have not fully met the Canadian screening criteria.

For television categories, the qualifying period corresponds more closely to the traditional television season than the calendar year, beginning 1 September of the second year before the ceremony and ending, depending on the category, either 31 August or 15 November of the year before the ceremony. An ongoing television series whose season straddles the cutoff date for its category is still eligible if it has aired at least one-third of its episodes within the eligibility period.

Awards ceremonies

Awards categories
The Canadian Screen Awards has roughly 130 categories in total. There are 24 film categories, 100 television categories, and 10 digital media categories. As with the Genie Awards, all Canadian films, regardless of language, are eligible to receive awards in the film categories. However, as with the Gemini Awards, only English-language productions are eligible for television categories: the Academy continues to hold the Prix Gémeaux, a separate ceremony honouring French-language television productions.

Film

 Best Motion Picture
 Best Feature Length Documentary (Ted Rogers Award)
 Best Short Documentary
 Best Live Action Short Drama
 Best Animated Short
 Best Director
 Best Original Screenplay
 Best Adapted Screenplay
 Best Performance in a Leading Role in a Film (formerly Best Actor and Best Actress)
 Best Performance in a Supporting Role in a Film (formerly Best Supporting Actor and Best Supporting Actress)
 Best Art Direction / Production Design
 Best Casting (Film)
 Best Cinematography

 Best Cinematography in a Documentary
 Best Editing
 Best Editing in a Documentary
 Best Costume Design
 Best Makeup
 Best Hair
 Best Original Score
 Best Original Song
 Best Original Music in a Documentary
 Best Visual Effects
 Best Sound Editing
 Best Sound Mixing
 Best Stunt Coordination

Television

Digital media
Best Cross-Platform Project – Children's and Youth
Best Cross-Platform Project – Fiction
Best Cross-Platform Project – Non-Fiction
Best Immersive Experience
Best Original Interactive Production Produced for Digital Media
Best Original Program or Series Produced for Digital Media – Fiction
Best Original Program or Series Produced for Digital Media – Non-Fiction
Best Direction in a Program or Series Produced for Digital Media
Best Actor in a Program or Series Produced for Digital Media
Best Actress in a Program or Series Produced for Digital Media
Social Innovator Award

Special categories 

Academy Achievement Award
Best First Feature
Board of Directors' Tribute
Digital Media Trailblazing Award
Diversity Award
Earle Grey Award
Fan Choice Award
Cogeco Fund Audience Choice Award
Golden Screen Award

Gordon Sinclair Award
Humanitarian Award
Icon Award
Legacy Award
Lifetime Achievement Award
Margaret Collier Award
Outstanding Technical Achievement Award
Radius Award
Shaw Rocket Fund Kids' Choice Award

See also

Canadian television awards
Prix Iris

References

External links

 
 Canadian Screen Awards Rules & Regulations — Film
 Canadian Screen Awards Rules & Regulations — TV and digital media

 
Canadian film awards
Canadian television awards
Web awards
Awards established in 2013
Academy of Canadian Cinema & Television
2013 establishments in British Columbia